Donald Kirk is a veteran correspondent and author on conflict and crisis from Southeast Asia to the Middle East to Northeast Asia. Kirk has covered wars from Vietnam to Iraq, focusing on political, diplomatic, economic and social as well as military issues. He is also known for his reporting on North Korea, including the nuclear crisis, human rights and payoffs from South to North Korea preceding the June 2000 inter-Korean summit.[1]

Career 
After several years as a metro reporter for the Chicago Sun-Times and the New York Post, 1960-1964, Kirk free-lanced from Indonesia in “The Year of Living Dangerously,” 1965–1966, writing about the fall of Sukarno and mass killings in Java and Bali. He covered Vietnam, Cambodia and Laos in the late 1960s and early 1970s for the old Washington (DC) Star and then for the Chicago Tribune, reporting on the 1968 Tet Offensive, the 1970 downfall of Prince Sihanouk and the U.S. incursion into Cambodia and the 1972 Easter Offensive in Vietnam. He also wrote articles for The New York Times Magazine and The  New Leader and two books before gravitating to northeast Asia.

Kirk was correspondent for The Observer (London) in Japan and Korea from the late 1970s to 1982, covering the assassination of President Park Chung-hee of Korea in 1979, the 1980 Gwangju revolt, and financial, diplomatic and political issues in Japan for The Observer and newspapers in the U.S. and Canada. After covering the Israeli invasion of Lebanon in 1982 from Beirut and Tel Aviv, he joined USA Today in August 1982 as the paper's first world editor. For USA Today, he ranged from Europe to Asia, reporting on war in Lebanon, revolt in El Salvador and Nicaragua, the 1985-1986 People Power revolution in the Philippines, the democracy revolt in Korea, the 1988 Seoul Olympics, the 1989 Tiananmen Square uprising, the 1989 fall of Ceausescu, and the Gulf War from Baghdad, including the U.S. bombing, 1990-91.

After publishing an unauthorized biography of Chung Ju-yung, founder of the Hyundai empire, in 1994, Kirk served in Korea as correspondent for the International Herald Tribune, 1997–2003, and the Christian Science Monitor and CBS Radio, 2004-2020, covering the sinking of the South Korean navy ship Cheonan and the shelling of Yeonpyeong Island in 2010, North Korean nuclear and missile tests, anti-American protests, U.S.-Korea trade disputes and Korean politics. He has visited North Korea eight times, writing for Forbes Asia and others, and reported for Institutional Investor and CBS from Baghdad in 2004. He writes columns for The Korea Times and Future Korea and has reported for The Daily Beast since the 2018 Pyeongchang Winter Olympics and the June 2018 Singapore summit between President Donald Trump and North Korea’s Kim Jong-un.

Education 
Kirk holds a bachelor's degree from Princeton, a master's in international relations from the University of Chicago and an honorary doctorate from the University of Maryland Global Campus. He was a Fulbright scholar, New Delhi, 1962–1963; a Ford fellow in Columbia University's advanced international reporting program, 1964–1965; Edward R. Murrow fellow, the Council on Foreign Relations, 1974–1975, visiting fellow, Cornell's Southeast Asia program, 1986-1988; Fulbright senior research scholar, Manila, 1994–1995, Abe fellow, Social Science Research Council, Japan and Korea, 2012; Fulbright-Nehru senior scholar, New Delhi, 2013.

Awards 
Kirk won the Overseas Press Club of America Award, 1974, Asia reporting, for articles in the Chicago Tribune on the grim future for South Vietnam after the signing of the Paris Peace Agreement in 1973; the George Polk Award, foreign reporting, 1975, for exposing corruption in Vietnam and Cambodia; the Chicago Tribune’s Edward Scott Beck award, 1974; three Overseas Press Club citations, and the Chicago Newspaper Guild Page-One Award, feature-writing, 1962.

Professional organizations 
Kirk is a Silver Owl member of the National Press Club, Washington, a life member of the Foreign Correspondents’ Club of Hong Kong, a fellow of the Institute for Corean-American Studies, and served six terms on the board of the Seoul Foreign Correspondents’ Club. He also belongs to the Overseas Press Club of America, International House of Japan, the Authors Guild of America, the Society of Professional Journalists and the American Society of Journalists and Authors.

Books 

 Kim Dae Jung Shinwha (The Legend of Kim Dae Jung), 2010 (Boogle Books, Seoul), .
 Korea Betrayed: Kim Dae Jung and Sunshine, 2009 (Palgrave Macmillan, New York, UK), .
 Jakten Pa Nobels Fredsris (The Search for the Nobel Peace Prize), with Kim Kisam, 2016 (Spartacus, Oslo), .
 Encyclopedia of Human Rights, entries on North Korea, South Korea, Kim Dae Jung, 2009 (Oxford, New York), .
 Korea Witness: 135 Years of War, Crisis and News in the Land of the Morning Calm, co-editor with Choe Sang-hun, 2006 (EunHaeng NaMu, Seoul), .
 Korean Crisis: Unraveling of the Miracle in the IMF Era, 2000, paperback 2002 (St. Martin's, NY, Macmillan UK), .
 Philippines in Crisis: U.S. Power versus Local Revolt, 2006 (Anvil, Manila), .
 Looted: The Philippines After the Bases, 1998, paperback, 2000 (St. Martin's, NY, Macmillan UK), .
 Business Guide to the Philippines, general editor, 1996 (Butterworth-Heinemann, Singapore, 1998, ; 2012 (Routledge, London).
 Tell it to the Dead: Stories of a War, foreword by Arthur Dommen, 1996 (M.E. Sharpe, Armonk NY) ; 2016 (Routledge, London).
 Korean Dynasty: Hyundai and Chung Ju Yung, 1994 (M.E. Sharpe, Armonk, and Asia2000, Hong Kong), ; 2016 (Routledge, London).
 Tell it to the Dead: Memories of a War, 1975 (Nelson-Hall, Burnham, Chicago), .
 Wider War: The Struggle for Cambodia, Thailand and Laos, 1971 (Praeger, New York, Pall Mall, London), .

References
1.   ^ Donald Kirk (2011-04-30). Time to wise up on North Korea. The Asia Times, retrieved August 25, 2011

2.   ^ "Former Edward R. Murrow Press Fellows - Council on Foreign Relations". Cfr.org. Archived from the original on 2010-08-31. Retrieved 2012-02-26.

3.   ^ "The Year of Living Dangerously". Peterweircave.com. Retrieved 2012-02-26.

4.   ^ Donald Kirk (2010-03-23). Donald Kirk: Vanished in a time of killing. The Projo Website, retrieved June 6, 2010

5.   ^ Reporting Vietnam: American Journalism 1959 - 1975 Reporting Vietnam: Paperback Edition Archived July 10, 2010, at the Wayback Machine. The Library of America, retrieved June 6, 2010

6.   ^ Donald Kirk KJ Special On-line Features: Looking Back at the Tet Offensive Archived August 2, 2009, at the Wayback Machine. The Kyoto Journal, retrieved June 6, 2010

7.   ^ MacArthur, John R. (2004), Second Front: Censorship and Propaganda in the 1991 Gulf War (1st ed.), California: University of California Press

8.   ^ Susan Jeffords, Lauren Rabinovitz, “Seeing Through the Media: The Persian Gulf War,” p. 127

9.   ^ "A Conversation with Writer and Journalist Donald Kirk on his book, Korea Betrayed: Kim Dae Jung and Sunshine | Center for Strategic and International Studies". Csis.org. Retrieved 2012-02-26.

10. ^ "Home | Asia-Pacific Business and Technology Report". Biztechreport.com. Retrieved 2012-02-26.

11. ^ "OPC Awards Past Recipients | Overseas Press Club of America". Opcofamerica.org. 2010-01-12. Archived from the original on 2012-07-17. Retrieved 2012-02-26.

12. ^ "Search - Long Island University". Liu.edu. Retrieved 2012-02-26.

13. ^ [1] Archived June 20, 2010, at the Wayback Machine

14. ^ "ICAS Fellow Roster". Icasinc.org. 2011-12-12. Retrieved 2012-02-26.

15. ^ "AuthorsGuild.org Home". The Authors Guild. Archived from the original on 2012-02-29. Retrieved 2012-02-26.

16. ^ "President's Letter 2008-04". ASJA. Retrieved 2012-02-26.

Sources 
 Bio, Northeast Asia Editor of the Internet newspaper, World Tribune
 Bio, American Society of Journalists and Authors Member
 Bio, Institute of Corean-American Studies

Articles or interviews 
 “My First Foreign Correspondent,” by Pulitzer Prize winning reporter Choe Sang Hun, “Korea Witness,” pp. 277–280
 Kirk Has 2nd Thoughts on Sunshine Policy,” by JR Breen, Korea Times, November 24, 2009
 Interview, by Charles Duerden, Korea Trade & Investment, journal of the Korea Trade-Investment Promotion Agency, KOTRA, September–October 2003.
 Talk to the Editor for May 27, Tension in Korea, interview by Christian Science Monitor Editor John Yemma and Pat Murphy, May 27, 2010
 CAMBODIAN WAR: 1970 -1975 A First and Last Reunion of a Unique Band of Brothers & Sisters, Cambodia News (CAMNEWS)
 KBS World, Seoul Report, Matt Kelley Interviews Don Kirk

External links 
 Donald Kirk Web site
 Reporting Vietnam: American Journalism 1969-1975 (Library of America), Donald Kirk, New York Times Magazine article on U.S. troops, Chicago Tribune article on Khmer Rouge
 CBS Newsman Don Kirk quoted in CBS News online article on suspected North Korean missile test
 Report by CBS Radio News Reporter Don Kirk for CBS Radio News Weekend Roundup with Dan Raviv (Oct 5, 2007)
 Al Jazeera TV interview with Donald Kirk
 Russia Today TV interview with Donald Kirk
 Two-way, CBS Radio News Reporter Don Kirk and WWL Radio, New Orleans
 Los Angeles Times Op-Ed article by Donald Kirk on South Korea’s ‘Sunshine Policy’

American war correspondents
George Polk Award recipients
Princeton University alumni
People from New Jersey
Living people
Year of birth missing (living people)